Nicholas Quinn Rosenkranz (born November 28, 1970) is an American constitutional law scholar, professor, and Broadway producer. He writes and teaches in the fields of constitutional law, statutory interpretation, and federal jurisdiction.  He is the son of billionaire investor and philanthropist Robert Rosenkranz.

Rosenkranz clerked for Justice Anthony Kennedy and served as an attorney-advisor in the Office of Legal Counsel. He regularly contributes legal commentary for news media, including Fox News, PBS, C-SPAN, and other media organizations. His work has been cited by Supreme Court Justices Samuel Alito and Clarence Thomas.

Early life

Family 
Rosenkranz is the son of billionaire investor Robert Rosenkranz and Margaret "Peggy" Hill.  His father is Jewish. His sister, Stephanie Rosenkranz Hessler, is also a legal scholar and a fellow at the Manhattan Institute.

Education
Rosenkranz is a graduate of Phillips Academy, Yale University (Bachelor of Arts, English, 1992), and Yale Law School (Juris Doctor, 1999).  At law school, he was also an Olin Fellow in Law and Economics.

Federal government

Judiciary
After graduating law school, Rosenkranz clerked for  Judge Frank H. Easterbrook of the United States Court of Appeals for the Seventh Circuit and for Associate Justice Anthony Kennedy of the Supreme Court of the United States.

Nicholas Quinn Rosenkranz was on a list the Trump White House sent to Schumer and Gillibrand in July that included three other names for the US Court of Appeals for the Second Circuit, where there were two vacancies: The other names were US District Judge Richard J. Sullivan; Matthew McGill, a partner at the law firm Gibson Dunn in Washington and Michael H. Park, a partner at the law firm Consovoy McCarthy Park in New York.

Rosenkranz has filed numerous briefs with, and presented oral arguments before, the Supreme Court.  In 2013, the National Law Journal featured Rosenkranz's Supreme Court brief that argued that Missouri v. Holland was wrongly decided in Bond v. United States.  Eight years prior to Bond v. United States (2013) Rosenkranz had written a similar article in the Harvard Law Review, Executing the Treaty Power, arguing that Missouri v. Holland had been wrongly decided.

Executive branch
From 2002 to 2004 Rosenkranz served as an attorney-advisor at the Office of Legal Counsel in the U.S. Department of Justice.  In 2016 he served as Senior Advisor on Legal Policy and Constitutional Law for candidate Marco Rubio during Rubio's 2016 election campaign.  He had previously been a member of 2008 presidential candidate John McCain's Justice Advisory Committee during the United States presidential election of 2008.

Congressional testimony
Rosenkranz has testified before the United States Congress as a legal expert, including in front of the Senate Judiciary Committee during the confirmation hearings for Sonia Sotomayor, President Obama's  Supreme Court nominee, and Loretta Lynch, Obama's nominee for Attorney General.  He also testified before the Oversight & Investigations Subcommittee of the House Financial Services Committee, on the constitutionality of the United States Department of Justice's bank settlement agreements after the 2008 financial crisis, and before the House Judiciary Committee on issues of a President of the United States' duty to "take Care that the Laws be faithfully executed."

Academia

Appointments
Rosenkranz joined the faculty at Georgetown University Law Center in 2004. Rosenkranz is a Senior Fellow in Constitutional Studies at the Cato Institute, and a Member of the Board of Directors of the Federalist Society.  He is also a co-founder of Heterodox Academy along with Jonathan Haidt, and serves on its executive committee.

Rosenkranz has been a National Fellow at the Hoover Institution and a Visiting Professor of Law at Stanford Law School.

Broadway producer
Rosenkranz has produced several Broadway productions, including David Mamet's Speed-the-Plow, David Mamet's Race, and Tom Stoppard's Arcadia. In 2011, he was nominated for a Tony Award for the Best Revival of a Play in Arcadia. His mother is Broadway producer, Peggy Hill.

Contributions to scholarly journals
 Intellectual Diversity in the Legal Academy, 37 Harvard Journal of Law and Public Policy 137–143 (2014). Intellectual Diversity in the Legal Academy
 The Objects of the Constitution, 63 Stanford Law Review 1005–1069 (2011). The Objects of the Constitution
 The Subjects of the Constitution, 62 Stanford Law Review 1209–1292 (2010). The Subjects of the Constitution
 An American Amendment, 32 Harvard Journal of Law and Public Policy 475–482 (2009). An American Amendment
 Condorcet and the Constitution: A Response to the Law of Other States, 59 Stanford Law Review 1281–1308 (2007). Condorcet and the Constitution: A Response to the Law of Other States
 Executing the Treaty Power, 118 Harvard Law Review 1867–1938 (2005). Executing the Treaty Power
 Federal Rules of Statutory Interpretation, 115 Harvard Law Review. 2085–2157 (2002). Federal Rules of Statutory Interpretation

Congressional testimony

 Settling the Question: Did Bank Settlement Agreements Subvert Congressional Appropriations Powers?: Hearing Before the Subcomm. on Oversight & Investigations of the House Banking Committee, 114th Congress, May 19, 2016 (Statement of Nicholas Quinn Rosenkranz) (CIS-No.: Pending).  
 Confirmation Hearing on the Nomination of Loretta Lynch to be Attorney General of the United States: Hearing Before the Senate Judiciary Committee, 114th Congress, Jan. 29, 2015 (Statement of Nicholas Quinn Rosenkranz) (CIS-No.: Pending). United States Senate Committee on the Judiciary
 The President of the United States’ Constitutional Duty To Faithfully Execute the Laws: Hearing Before the House Judiciary Committee, 113th Congress, Dec. 3, 2013 (Statement of Nicholas Quinn Rosenkranz) (CIS-No.: Pending). Nicholas Quinn Rosenkranz testifies before the House Judiciary Committee on presidential powers and the constitution on C-SPAN 2 Presidential Powers and the Constitution | C-SPAN.org
 Confirmation Hearing on the Nomination of Hon. Sonia Sotomayor, To Be an Associate Justice of the Supreme Court of the United States: Hearing Before the Senate Judiciary Committee, 111th Congress, July 16, 2009 (Statement of Nicholas Quinn Rosenkranz) (CIS-No.: 2011-S521-1). The Nomination of Sonia Sotomayor to be an Associate Justice of the Supreme Court of the United States: Hearing Before the S. Comm. on the Judiciary, 111th Cong., July 16, 2009 (Statement of Professor Nicholas Quinn Rosenkranz, Geo. U. L. Center)
 Impact of the Presidential Signing Statement on the Department of Defense's Implementation of the Fiscal Year 2008 National Defense Authorization Act: Hearing Before the Subcomm. on Oversight & Investigations of the House Armed Services Committee., 110th Congress, Mar. 11, 2008 (Statement of Nicholas Quinn Rosenkranz) (CIS-No.: 2009-H201-37). The President's Signing Statement upon Signing the National Defense Authorization Act for Fiscal Year 2008: Hearing Before the Subcomm. on Oversight and Investigations of the H. Comm. on Armed Services,, 110th Cong., Mar. 11, 2008 (Statement of Nicholas Quinn Rosenkranz, Geo. U. L. Center)
 Presidential Signing Statements Under the Bush Administration: Hearing Before the House Judiciary Committee, 110th Congress, Jan. 31, 2007 (Statement of Nicholas Quinn Rosenkranz) (CIS No.: 2007-H521-18). Presidential Signing Statements Under the Bush Administration: A Threat to Checks and Balances and the Rule of Law?: Hearing Before the H. Comm. on the Judiciary, 110th Cong., Jan. 31, 2007 (Statement of Nicholas Quinn Rosenkranz, Prof. of Law, Geo. U. L. Center)
 Presidential Signing Statements: Hearing Before the Senate Judiciary Committee, 109th Congress, June 27, 2006 (Statement of Nicholas Quinn Rosenkranz) (CIS No.: 2007-H521-18). Presidential Signing Statements: Hearing Before the S. Comm. on the Judiciary, 109th Cong., June 27, 2006 (Statement of Nicholas Quinn Rosenkranz, Prof. of Law, Geo. U. L. Center)
 House Resolution on the Appropriate Role of Foreign Judgements in the Interpretation of the Constitution of the United States: Hearing Before the Subcomm. on the Constitution, House Judiciary Committee, 109th Congress, July 19, 2005 (Statement of Nicholas Quinn Rosenkranz) (CIS-No.: 2005-H521-48). House Resolution on the Appropriate Role of Foreign Judgements in the Interpretation of the Constitution of the United States: Hearing Before the Subcomm. on the Constitution, H. Comm. on the Judiciary, 109th Cong., July 19, 2005 (Statement of Nicholas Quinn Rosenkranz, Prof. of Law, Geo. U. L. Center)

See also 
 List of law clerks of the Supreme Court of the United States (Seat 1)

References

External links
 

1970 births
Living people
20th-century American lawyers
21st-century American lawyers
American legal scholars
American legal writers
Cato Institute people
Federalist Society members
George W. Bush administration personnel
Georgetown University Law Center faculty
Jewish American academics
Law clerks of the Supreme Court of the United States
Lawyers from Washington, D.C.
New York (state) lawyers
United States Department of Justice lawyers
Yale Law School alumni